Torrespaña (literally "Spain Tower") is a  steel-and-concrete television tower located in Madrid, Spain. National terrestrial television channels RTVE, Telecinco and Antena 3, as well as the autonomous channel Telemadrid, along with a few radio stations, broadcast from the tower. 

The tower was built in 1982, as part of the infrastructure works for FIFA World Cup played in Spain that year. The building was administered by RTVE until 1989 when control over radio and television emissions in Spanish territory was given to Retevisión. It is generally known in Madrid as the "Pirulí", given the similarity between the tower and a particular type of lollipop of conical shape very popular in Spain in the eighties. 

Located in a depression, next to the M30 highway,despite the height and its viewpoint the tower is not open to the  public.

External links

Buildings and structures in Salamanca District, Madrid
Towers completed in 1982
Communication towers in Spain
1982 establishments in Spain